The history of French animation is one of the longest in the world, as France has created some of the earliest animated films dating back to the late 19th century, and invented many of the foundational technologies of early animation.

The first pictured movie was from Frenchman Émile Reynaud, who created the praxinoscope, an advanced successor to the zoetrope that could project animated films up to 16 frames long, and films of about 500~600 pictures, projected on its own Théâtre Optique at Musée Grévin in Paris, France, on 28 October 1892.
 
Émile Cohl created what is most likely the first real animated cartoon to be drawn on paper, Fantasmagorie in 1908. The film featured many morphing figures. He is also thought to have pioneered puppet animation in 1910, pixilation in 1911 and to have started the first animated series in 1916 with La journée de Flambeau (also known as Flambeau, chien perdu).

Other notable French animations
Une Nuit sur le Mont Chauve (Night on Bald Mountain), 1933, directed by Alexander Alexeieff and Claire Parker. Animated entirely using the pinscreen apparatus, a device invented by Alexieff and Parker that gives the impression of animated engravings.

Le Roman de Renart (The Tale of the Fox), 1930/1937, directed by Ladislas Starevich.  The first French animated feature film.  The animation was finished in 1930 but a soundtrack was only added in 1937, and it was a German one.  A French-language version was released in 1941.

La Demoiselle et le violoncelliste (The Girl and the Cellist), 1965, directed by Jean-François Laguionie. Laguionie's first film, which won the Annecy Grand Prix in 1965.

1967 saw the release of Astérix le Gaulois (Asterix the Gaul), directed by Ray Goossens. This was the first movie based on the long-running Asterix comics; however, it was made without the knowledge of the comics' creators René Goscinny and Albert Uderzo, and is not widely liked by fans. The following year (1968), Goscinny and Uderzo worked with co-director Lee Payant on a sequel, Astérix et Cléopâtre (Asterix and Cleopatra).

René Laloux's first feature film La Planète sauvage (The Savage Planet, 1973), a cutout animation science fantasy that was animated in Czechoslovakia, which won the Grand Prix at the 1973 Cannes Film Festival. Laloux went on to direct two other features; Les Maîtres du temps (1982, a collaboration with the famed French comics artist Mœbius animated in Hungary) and Gandahar (1988, animated in North Korea).

Le Roi et l'oiseau (The King and the Mockingbird), 1980, directed by Paul Grimault. Begun in 1948 as The Sheperdess and the Chimney Sweep; cited by the Japanese directors Hayao Miyazaki and Isao Takahata as an influence. Originally produced in 1948, it had a production time of over 30 years, making it one of the longest production periods in history.

Quarxs 1989–1993 by Maurice Benayoun and François Schuiten, was one of the earliest computer animated series and the first one produced in HD. Widely broadcast and awarded, Quarxs opened the path to 3D animated series on TV.

Les Aventures de Tintin (The Adventures of Tintin), began 1990, directed by Stéphane Bernasconi. TV series based on the famous Belgian comic of the same name.

Kirikou et la sorcière (Kirikou and the Sorceress), 1998, directed by Michel Ocelot. Critically acclaimed movie based on a West African folktale; the Japanese dub was written by Isao Takahata and released by Studio Ghibli.
Azur & Asmar: The Princes' Quest, by the same director and co-produced in Italy, Belgium and Spain, was nominated for a Goya Award for Best Animated Film, its score was nominated for the César Award for Best Music Written for a Film at the César Awards 2007 and it won the best animated feature at the Zagreb World Festival of Animated Films 2007.

Les Triplettes de Belleville (The Triplets of Belleville), 2003, directed by Sylvain Chomet was nominated for two Academy Awards — Best Animated Feature and Best Original Song for "Belleville Rendez-vous" in 2004. Another movie of Chomet, The Illusionist, was nominated for the Academy Award for Best Animated Feature in 2011 (it was also nominated for a Golden Globe Award for Best Animated Feature Film).

Kaena: La prophétie (Kaena: The Prophecy), 2003, directed by  Chris Delaporte and Pascal Pinon. A CGI fantasy movie co-produced with Canada. It was both critical and commercial failure.

Totally Spies, began 2001, created by Vincent Chalvon-Demersay and David Michel. TV series co-produced with the USA; one of French animation's biggest hits Stateside.

Persepolis, directed by Marjane Satrapi, was released in 2007 and was nominated for an Academy Award for Best Animated Feature at the 80th Academy Awards (it was also nominated for a BAFTA Award for Best Animated Film).

A Cat in Paris, directed by Alain Gagnol and Jean-Loup Felicioli, was nominated for an Academy Award for Best Animated Feature at the 84th Academy Awards.

The Little Prince is actually the most successful French and Italian animated film.

Films from the 1930s to the 1960s 

 1937 : Le Roman de Renard – by Ladislas Starevitch – (France/Germany)
 1949 : Alice au pays des merveilles – by Lou Bunin – (UK/France)
 1950 : Jeannot l'intrépide – by Jean Image
 1952 : La Bergère et le ramoneur – by Paul Grimault
 1953 :  – by Jean Image
 1956 : La Création du monde (Stvorení sveta) – (France/Tchécoslovaquie)
 1956 : Une fée... pas comme les autres – (Italy/France)
 1965 : La Demoiselle et le Violoncelliste – by Jean-François Laguionie
 1967 : Astérix le Gaulois – (France/Belgium)
 1967 : Le Théâtre de Monsieur et Madame Kabal – by Walerian Borowczyk
 1968 : Astérix et Cléopâtre
 1969 : Aladin et la lampe merveilleuse – by Jean Image
 1969 : Tintin et le temple du soleil – (France/Belgium/Switzerland)

Films of the 1970s 

 1970 : Fablio le magicien – by Georges de La Grandière, Attila Dargay, Radka Badcharova and Victor Antonescu
 1970 : Pollux et le chat bleu – by Serge Danot – (Royaume-Uni/France)
 1971 : Daisy Town – by René Goscinny (Belgium/France)
 1972 : Tintin et le lac aux requins – by Raymond Leblanc (Belgium/France)
 1973 : Joe le petit boum-boum – by Jean Image
 1973 : La Planète sauvage – by René Laloux – (Tchécoslovaquie/France)
 1974 : La Genèse – by Pierre Alibert
 1974 : Around the World with Peynet's Lovers – by Cesare Perfetto (Italy/France)
 1975 : La Honte de la jungle – by Picha and Boris Szulzinger – (France/Belgium)
 1976 : Les Douze travaux d'Astérix – by Goscinny and Uderzo 
 1978 : La Ballade des Dalton – by  Morris and Goscinny
 1979 : Les Fabuleuses aventures du légendaire Baron de Munchausen – by Jean Image
 1979 : Pluk, naufragé de l'espace – by Jean Image
 1979 : Ubu et la grande gidouille – by Jan Lenica

Films of the 1980s 

 1980 : Le Chaînon manquant – by Picha – (France/Belgium)
 1980 : Le Roi et l'Oiseau – by Paul Grimault
 1981 : Minoïe – by Jean Jabely and Philippe Landrot
 1982 : Les Maîtres du temps – by René Laloux
 1983 : L'Enfant invisible – by André Lindon
 1983 : Lucky Luke, les Dalton en cavale – by Morris, William Hanna, Joseph Barbera – (France/UK)
 1983 : La Revanche des humanoïdes
 1983 : Le Secret des Sélénites – by Jean Image
 1984 : Gwen, le livre de sable – by Jean-François Laguionie
 1985 : Astérix et la Surprise de César – by Paul Brizzi and Gaëtan Brizzi
 1986 : Astérix chez les Bretons – by Pino van Lamsweerde
 1987 : Le Big Bang – by Picha – (France/Belgium)
 1988 : Gandahar – by René Laloux
 1988 : La Table tournante – by Paul Grimault
 1989 : Astérix et le coup du menhir – by Philippe Grimond
 1989 : Le Triomphe de Babar – by Alan Bunce – (Canada/France)

Films of the 1990s 

 1991 : Robinson et compagnie – by Jacques Colombat
 1993 : Les Mille et une farces de Pif et Hercule – by Bruno Desraisses and Charles by Latour
 1995 : Le monde est un grand Chelm – by Albert Hanan Kaminski – (France/Allemagne/Hongrie)
 1996 : Les Boulugres – by Jean Hurtado - Finished in 1984, the film was finally released in 1996
 1996 : Nanook - Le grand combat – by Gérald Fleury – (France/Canada)
 1998 : Kirikou et la Sorcière – by Michel Ocelot – (France/Belgium/Luxembourg)
 1999 : Babar, roi des éléphants – by Raymond Jafelice – (Canada/France/Allemagne)
 1999 : Carnival – by Deane Taylor – (Irlande/France)
 1999 : Le Château des singes – by Jean-François Laguionie – (France/Royaume-Uni/Allemagne)

Films of the 2000s 

 2000 : Princes et princesses – by Michel Ocelot
 2001 : Bécassine, le trésor viking – by Philippe Vidal
 2001 : Petit Potam – by Christian Choquet and Bernard Deyriès
 2002 : Corto Maltese : La cour secrète des Arcanes – by Pascal Morelli – (France/Italie/Luxembourg)
 2002 : L'Enfant qui voulait être un ours – by Jannick Astrup – (Denmark/France)
 2002 : Tristan and Iseut – by Thierry Schiel
 2003 : Le Chien, le Général et les Oiseaux – by Francis Nielsen – (Italie/France)
 2003 : Les Enfants de la pluie – by Philippe Leclerc – (France/Corée du Sud)
 2003 : Kaena, la prophétie – by Chris Delaporte and Pascal Pinon – (France/Canada)
 2003 : La Légende de Parva – by Jean Cubaud – (France/Italie)
 2003 : La Prophétie des grenouilles – by Jacques-Rémy Girerd
 2003 : Interstella 5555: The 5tory of the 5ecret 5tar 5ystem – by Katsuhisa Takenouchi – (France/Japan)
 2003 : The Triplets of Belleville (Les Triplettes de Belleville) – by Sylvain Chomet – (France/Belgium/Canada/UK)
 2003 : Les Trois rois mages – by Antonio Navarro (France/Espagne)
 2004 : Les Aventures extraordinaires de Michel Strogoff – by Bruno-René Huchez
 2004 : L'Île de Black Mór – by Jean-François Laguionie
 2004 : Pinocchio le robot –  by Daniel Robichaud – (Canada/France/Spain)
 2004 : T'choupi – by Jean-Luc François
 2004 : Kirikou et les bêtes sauvages – by Michel Ocelot and Bénédicte Galup
 2005 : Pollux, le manège enchanté – by Jean Duval – (UK/France)
 2006 : Arthur et les Minimoys – by Luc Besson
 2006 : Astérix et les Vikings – by Stefan Fjeldmark and Jesper Møller – (France/Denmark)
 2006 : Azur et Asmar – by Michel Ocelot (France/Italy/Belgium/Spain)
 2006 : Franklin et le trésor du lac – by Dominique Monféry – (Canada/France)
 2006 : Piccolo, Saxo et Cie – by Marco Villamizar and Éric Gutierrez- (France/Roumanie)
 2006 : Renaissance – by Christian Volckman
 2006 : U – by Serge Elissalde and Grégoire Solotareff
 2007 : Blanche-Neige, la suite – by Picha – (Belgium/France)
 2007 : La Reine Soleil – by Philippe Leclerc – (France/Hongrie/Belgium)
 2007 : Nocturna, la nuit magique – by Victor Maldonado, Adrian Garcia – (Espagne/France/Royaume-Uni)
 2007 : Persepolis – by Vincent Paronnaud and Marjane Satrapi
 2007 : Tous à l'Ouest – by Olivier Jean-Marie – Une adaptation de l'album de Lucky Luke nommée "La Caravane"
 2007 : Le Vilain Petit Canard et moi – by Michael Hegner, Karsten Kiilerich – inspiré par le conte d'Andersen
 2008 : Arthur et la Vengeance de Maltazard – by Luc Besson
 2008 : Chasseurs de dragons – by Guillaume Ivernel
 2008 : Igor – by Anthony Leondis – (UK/France) – réalisé dans les studios d'animation Sparx, à Paris.
 2008 : Max & Co –  by Samuel and Frédéric Guillaume – (Switzerland/Belgium/France/Royaume-Uni)
 2008 : Mia et le Migou – by Jacques-Rémy Girerd
 2008 : Peur(s) du noir - by Blutch, Charles Burns and Marie Caillou
 2008 : La Véritable Histoire du chat botté – by Jérôme Deschamps – (France/Belgium/Switzerland)
 2009 : Lascars : Pas de vacances pour les vrais gars ! – by Albert Pereira-Lazaro and Emmanuel Klotz – (France/Allemagne) – réalisé par le studio Borisfen-Lutece en Ukraine
 2009 : Kérity, la maison des contes – by Dominique Monféry – (France/Italy)
 2009 : Brendan et le Secret de Kells – by Tomm Moore and Nora Twomey (Belgium/France/Irlande)

Films of the 2010s 

 2010 : L'Apprenti Père Noël (film, 2010) – by Luc Vinciguerra – (France/Australie/Irlande)
 2010 : L'Illusionniste – by Sylvain Chomet – (France/Royaume-Uni)
 2010 : Une vie de chat – d'Alain Gagnol and Jean-Loup Felicioli – (France/Pays-Bas/Switzerland/Belgium)
 2010 : Arthur 3 – la Guerre des deux mondes by Luc Besson
 2011 : Émilie Jolie – by Francis Nielsen and Philippe Chatel
 2011 : Le Chat du rabbin –  by Joann Sfar and Antoine Delesvaux
 2011 : Les Contes de la nuit – by Michel Ocelot
 2011 : The Prodigies – d’Antoine Charreyron – (France/Royaume-Uni/Inde/Belgium/Canada/Luxembourg/Pologne)
 2011 : Titeuf, le film – by Zep – (France/Switzerland)
 2011 : Un monstre à Paris – by Bibo Bergeron
 2011 : Le Rêve de Galiléo – by Gil Alkabetz, Ghislain Avrillon, Alex Cervantes and Fabienne Collet – (France/Allemagne/Espagnol)
 2011 : Le tableau – by Jean-François Laguionie
 2012 : Couleur de peau : miel – by  Laurent Boileau and Jung Sik-jun – (France/Belgium)
 2012 : Zarafa – by Rémi Bezançon and Jean-Christophe Lie
 2012 : Kirikou et les hommes et les femmes – by Michel Ocelot
 2012 : Ernest et Célestine – by Benjamin Renner, Stéphane Aubier and Vincent Patar
 2013 : Aya de Yopougon – by Marguerite Abouet and Clément Oubrerie
 2013 : L'Apprenti Père Noël et le flocon magique – by Luc Vinciguerra
 2013 : Ma maman est en Amérique, elle a rencontré Buffalo Bill – by Marc Boréal and Thibaut Chatel – (France/Luxembourg)
 2014 : Astérix: Le Domaine des Dieux – by Alexandre Astier – (France/Belgium)
 2015 : April and the Extraordinary World – by Christian Desmares, Franck Ekinci
 2015 : Long Way North - by Rémi Chayé
 2016 : Louise by the Shore - by Jean-François Laguionie
 2018 : Astérix: Le Secret de la Potion Magique – by Louis Clichy
 2018 : White Fang (2018 film) – by Alexandre Espigares
 2019 : I Lost My Body - by Jeremy Clapin

Films of the 2020s 
 2020 : Calamity, a Childhood of Martha Jane Cannary - by Rémi Chayé
 2021 : Where Is Anne Frank - by Ari Folman
 2021 : The Summit of the Gods (film)
 2022: My Father's Secrets -  by Vera Belmont

Featurettes

 1982 : Chronopolis – by Piotr Kamler – (France/Pologne)
 1983 : La princesse insensible – by Michel Ocelot
 1997 : Du tableau noir à l'écran blanc – by Paul Dopff
 2002 : Solitudine – by Bernard Cerf
 2003 : Corto Maltese : La Ballade de la mer salée
 2003 : Corto Maltese : Sous le signe du Capricorne
 2003 : Corto Maltese : Les Celtiques
 2003 : Corto Maltese : La Maison dorée de Samarkand
 2003 : Halman's Walk – by Jean-Baptiste Decavèle
 2003 : Demake-up – by Marc Bruimaud
 2003 : La Cure Stories – by Frédérique Lecerf
 2004 : Grenze – by Patrick Fontana

Shorts
 1912 : Le Chinois and le Bourriquot articulé by Marius O'Galop
 1914 : Quelques principes d’hygiène by Marius O'Galop and Jean Comandon
 1917 : Les Aventures by Clémentine – by Benjamin Rabier and Émile Cohl
 1917 : Les Aventures des Pieds Nickelés - 1er épisode – by Émile Cohl – série Les Aventures des Pieds Nickelés
 1917 : Les Aventures des Pieds Nickelés - 2e épisode – by Émile Cohl – série Les Aventures des Pieds Nickelés
 1917 : Le Bon fricot –  by Marius O'Galop
 1917 : Les Tracas by Zigouillot – by Émile Cohl – série Les Aventures des Pieds Nickelés
 1917 : Clémentine and Flambeau – by Benjamin Rabier
 1917 : Conseils pour la vie chère – by Robert Lortac
 1917 : Et nos poilus qu’en pensent-ils ? – by Robert Lortac
 1917 : Les Exploits by Marius – by Robert Lortac
 1917 : Les Fiançailles by Flambeau – by Benjamin Rabier and Émile Cohl
 1917 : M. Wilson président des USA and l’espion obstiné – by Robert Lortac
 1917 : Misti le nain by la forêt – by Benjamin Rabier
 1917 : Une nouveauté pratique : la marmite norvégienne – by Robert Lortac
 1918 : Les Aventures des Pieds Nickelés - 5e épisode – by Émile Cohl – série Les Aventures des Pieds Nickelés
 1918 : L’Évasion by Latude – by Robert Lortac
 1918 : Filochard se distingue – by Émile Cohl – série Les Aventures des Pieds Nickelés
 1918 : On doit le dire by Marius O'Galop and Jean Comandon
 1918 : L'Oubli par l'alcool by Marius O'Galop and Jean Comandon
 1918 : Le Taudis doit être vaincu by Marius O'Galop and Jean Comandon
 1918 : La Tuberculose menace tout le monde – by Robert Lortac and Jean Comandon
 1918 : Tenfaipas se marie ce matin… – by Robert Lortac
 1918 : Touchatout ami des bêtes – by Marius O'Galop
 1919 : Bécassotte bonne à Quimper – by Marius O'Galop – série Bécassotte
 1919 : Bécassotte and son cochon – by Marius O'Galop – série Bécassotte
 1919 : Caramel – by Benjamin Rabier
 1919 : Le Circuit by l’alcool – by Marius O'Galop and Jean Comandon
 1919 : Comment Pécopin épousa la belle Ugénie – by Marius O'Galop
 1919 : La Journée by Flambeau – by Benjamin Rabier and Émile Cohl
 1919 : Flambeau au pays des surprises – by Benjamin Rabier and Émile Cohl
 1919 : Misti and le géant Rustic – by Benjamin Rabier
 1919 : La Mouche – by Marius O'Galop and Jean Comandon
 1919 : Petites causes grands effets – by Marius O'Galop and Jean Comandon
 1919 : Touchatout peintre by talent – by Marius O'Galop
 1919 : Touchatout joue Faust – by Marius O'Galop
 1919 : La Tuberculose se prend sur le zinc – by Marius O'Galop and Jean Comandon
 1919 : Un rude lapin – by Benjamin Rabier

Short films of the 1920s 

 1920 : Les Amours d'un escargot – by Benjamin Rabier
 1920 : Les Animaux domestiques ou Une aventure zoologicomique – by Robert Lortac and Landelle
 1920 : Bécassotte à la mer – by Marius O'Galop – série Bécassotte
 1920 : Bécassotte au jardin zoologique – by Marius O'Galop – série Bécassotte
 1920 : La Chasse aux rats est ouverte – by Robert Lortac
 1920 : Les Chevaliers by la cloche by bois – by Robert Lortac and Cheval
 1920 : Cœur by grenouille – by Benjamin Rabier
 1920 : Dans les griffes by l'araignée – by Ladislas Starewitch
 1920 : Les Éruptions célèbres – by Robert Lortac and Cheval
 1920 : Faites comme le nègre – by Robert Lortac and Landelle
 1920 : Gringalet and Ducosto ou La Revanche by Gringalet dentiste – by Robert Lortac and Landelle
 1920 : J'ai perdu mon enfant – by Benjamin Rabier
 1920 : Le Meilleur argument – by Robert Lortac and Landelle
 1920 : Microbus, Bigfellow and la crise des domestiques – by Robert Lortac and Landelle
 1920 : Monsieur Difficile a des visions – by Robert Lortac and Paulme
 1920 : Physique amusante – by Robert Lortac and Landelle
 1920 : On doit le dire – by  Marius O'Galop
 1920 : Physique amusante – by Robert Lortac and Landelle
 1920 : La Réponse by l’au-delà – by Robert Lortac
 1920 : Le Testament by Findubec – by Robert Lortac
 1920 : Tom and Tim policemen d’occasion – by Robert Lortac and J.J. Rouseau
 1920 : Un drame à la cuisine – by Robert Lortac
 1921 : L'Aspirateur du professeur Mécanicas – by Robert Lortac
 1921 : Bicard a résolu la crise du logement – by Raymond Galoyer and André Yvetot
 1921 : La Bonne cuisinière – by Robert Lortac – série Mécanicas
 1921 : Compère Guilleri, chanson ancienne – by Marius O'Galop
 1921 : La Consigne by Toby – by Robert Lortac – série Toby
 1921 : Le Corbeau and le Renard – by Marius O'Galop
 1921 : L'Épouvantail – by Ladislas Starewitch
 1921 : La Grenouille qui veut se faire aussi grosse que le bœuf – by Marius O'Galop
 1921 : Le Lièvre and la Tortue – by Marius O'Galop
 1921 : Le Mariage by Babylas – by Ladislas Starewitch
 1921 : Mistouffle dîne à l’oeil – by Robert Lortac
 1921 : Mistouffle au violon – by Robert Lortac
 1921 : Monsieur Duncam zoologiste anglais – by Robert Lortac
 1921 : Monsieur Vieux-Bois – by Robert Lortac and Cavé
 1921 : L'Ours and les Deux Compagnons – by Marius O'Galop
 1921 : Le Pot by terre contre le Pot by fer – by Robert Lortac and Cavé
 1921 : Potiron fait by l'auto – by Albert Mourlan – série Potiron
 1921 : Potiron, homme invisible – by Albert Mourlan – série Potiron
 1921 : Potiron garçon by café – by Albert Mourlan – série Potiron
 1921 : La Maison automatique ou Le Réveil du professeur Mécanicas – by Robert Lortac – série Mécanicas
 1921 : Toby a soif – by Robert Lortac – série Toby
 1921 : Toto au berceau – by Robert Lortac and Landelle – série Toto
 1921 : Une invention du professeur Mécanicas – by Robert Lortac – série Mécanicas
 1922 : L'Affaire by la rue Lepic – by Raymond Galoyer and André Yvetot
 1922 : Bigfellow craint les autos – by Robert Lortac and Landelle
 1922 : La Cigale and la Fourmi – by Robert Lortac and Landelle
 1922 : Les Déboires d'un piéton – by Robert Lortac and Landelle
 1922 : En vitesse – by Robert Lortac and Landelle
 1922 : Les Grenouilles qui demandent un roi – by Ladislas Starewitch
 1922 : Le Lion and le Rat – by Robert Lortac and Landelle
 1922 : Mère l'oie a mangé la grenouille – by Benjamin Rabier
 1922 : Monsieur by la Palisse – by Marius O'Galop
 1922 : Le Noël by Toto – by Robert Lortac and Landelle – série Toto
 1922 : Le Petit Poucet – by Marius O'Galop
 1921 : Potiron agent by police – by Albert Mourlan – série Potiron
 1922 : Les Quatre Cents Coups by Flambeau – by Benjamin Rabier
 1922 : La Queue en trompette – by Benjamin Rabier
 1922 : Un horrible cauchemar – by Robert Lortac and Landelle
 1923 : Bécassotte and le papillon – by Marius O'Galop – série Bécassotte
 1923 : La Belette entrée dans un grenier – by Marius O'Galop
 1923 : Cendrillon ou la petite pantoufle by vair – by Robert Lortac and Cheval
 1923 : L'Eau des géants and la poudre des nains – by Robert Lortac and Landelle
 1923 : Le Loup and la Cigogne – by Marius O'Galop and Louis Forest
 1923 : Mécanicas and la réclame – by Robert Lortac – série Mécanicas
 1923 : Le Rat des villes and le Rat des champs – by Marius O'Galop and Louis Forest
 1923 : Le Renard and les Raisins – by Marius O'Galop
 1923 : Le Roman by la momie – by Robert Lortac and André Rigal
 1923 : Gulliver chez les lilliputiens – by Albert Mourlan and Raymond Villette
 1923 : Toto acrobate – by Robert Lortac – série Toto
 1923 : Toto artiste peintre ou Toto est un artiste précoce – by Robert Lortac and Landelle – série Toto
 1923 : La Voix du rossignol – by Ladislas Starewitch
 1924 : Ballet mécanique – by Fernand Léger
 1924 : Boby prend la mouche – by Robert Lortac
 1924 : La Colombe and la Fourmi – by Marius O'Galop
 1924 : Entr'acte – by René Clair
 1924 : Les Malheurs by Collignon – by Robert Lortac and André Rigal
 1924 : La Petite Chanteuse des rues – by Ladislas Starewitch
 1924 : Les Inventions by Mécanicas, la Sève poilifère – by Robert Lortac – série Mécanicas
 1924 : Toto aviateur – by Robert Lortac – série Toto
 1924 : Toto musicien – by Robert Lortac – série Toto
 1924 : Un chien trop bien dressé – by Robert Lortac
 1925 : Mécanicas and la greffe animale – by Robert Lortac – série Mécanicas
 1925 : Mécanicas and la machine à guérir – by Robert Lortac – série Mécanicas
 1925 : La Révolte des betteraves – by Albert Mourlan
 1925 : Les Yeux du dragon – by Ladislas Starewitch
 1926 : Le Rat des villes and le Rat des champs – by Ladislas Starewitch
 1927 : La Coquille and le clergyman – by Germaine Dulac
 1928 : L'Étoile by mer – by Man Ray
 1928 : Joko le singe – by Antoine Payen – série Joko le singe
 1928 : L'Horloge magique ou la petite fille qui voulait être princesse – by Ladislas Starewitch
 1928 : La Petite Parade – by Ladislas Starewitch
 1929 : Conte by la 1002e nuit – by Albert Mourlan
 1929 : Les Mystères du Château by Dé – by Man Ray
 1929 : Zut épouse Flûte – by André Daix – série Zut, Flûte and Trotte
 1929 : Zut chez les sorcières – by André Daix – série Zut, Flûte and Trotte

Short films of the 1930s 

 1930 : Monsieur Grostacot and Madame Petitoto en voyage – by Robert Lortac and Mallet
 1930 : Les Petits Héros – by André Daix
 1931 : Ce soir à 8 heures – by Pierre Charbonnier
 1931 : L'Histoire du soldat inconnu – by Henri Storck
 1931 : Meunier, tu dors... – by Jean Delaurier and Jean Varé
 1931 : Natalité – by André Rigal
 1931 : Zut and Flûte passagers clandestins – by André Daix – série Zut, Flûte and Trotte
 1931 : Zut détective – by André Daix – série Zut, Flûte and Trotte
 1931 : Panouillard à bord – by André Daix
 1932 : L'Idée – by Berthold Bartosch
 1932 : Le Rat des villes and le rat des champs – by Ladislas Starewitch
 1932 : Un concours by beauté – by Alain Saint-Ogan
 1932 : Zut chez les sportifs – by André Daix – série Zut, Flûte and Trotte
 1933 : Fétiche mascotte – by Ladislas Starewitch
 1933 : Les Funérailles – by Anthony Gross
 1933 : Une journée en Afrique – by Anthony Gross
 1933 : Une nuit sur le mont Chauve – by Alexandre Alexeieff and Claire Parker
 1934 : La Découverte by l'Amérique – by Mimma Indelli
 1934 : Fétiche prestidigitateur by Ladislas Starewitch and Irène Starewitch
 1934 : Histoire sans paroles : À l'est rien by nouveau – by Bogdan Zoubowitch
 1934 : La Joie by vivre – by Anthony Gross and Hector Hoppins
 1935 : Couchés dans le foin – by Jean Delaurier, Georges Bouisset and Raymond by Villepreux
 1935 : Michka – by Bogdan Zoubowitch
 1936 : Anatole compositeur – by Érik (André Jolly)
 1936 : Les Aventures du professeur Nimbus – by André Daix and Jacques Noël
 1936 : Fétiche en voyage by noce – by Ladislas Starewitch and Irène Starewitch
 1936 : La Fortune enchantée – by Pierre Charbonnier
 1936 : Le Jour and la Nuit – by Anthony Gross
 1936 : Perrette and le pot au lait – by Pierre Bourgeon
 1938 : Barbe-Bleue – by Jean Painlevé and René Bertrand
 1939 : La Danse macabre – by Jean Giaume and Alex Giaume
 1939 : La Flûte enchantée – by Jean Giaume and Alex Giaume
 1939 : Les Galéjeurs by la mer – by Jean Giaume and Alex Giaume – série Olive and Marius
 1939 : Un certain Gérald – by Érik (André Jolly)

Short films of the 1940s 

 1940 : François Lefranc défend la pomme by terre – by Robert Lortac
 1941 : Prof toc savant – by Georges Arnstam – série Les Aventures du professeur Toc and by son robot
 1941 : La Vie idéale – by Pierre Bourgeon
 1941 : La Visite au zoo – by Pierre Bourgeon
 1942 : Cigalon chez les fourmis : Après l'orage by Pierre Bourgeon
 1942 : Élixir by longue vie – by Georges Arnstam – série Les Aventures du professeur Toc and by son robot
 1942 : L'Épouvantail – by Paul Grimault
 1942 : Le Marchand by notes – by Paul Grimault
 1942 : Les Théorèmes du professeur Pym : Qui pèse bien... – by Arcady Brachlianoff
 1942 : Une mouche sur le mur – by Érik (André Jolly)
 1943 : Les Aventures by Kapok l'esquimau and by son ours Oscar – by Arcady Brachlianoff – série Les Aventures by Kapok l'esquimau and by son ours Oscar
 1943 : Callisto, la petite nymphe by Diane – by André Édouard Marty
 1943 : Cap'taine Sabord appareille – by André Rigal – série Les Aventures du Cap'tain Sabord
 1943 : Le Carillon du vieux manoir – by Arcady Brachlianoff
 1943 : La Chasse infernale – by Jean Giaume and Alex Giaume
 1943 : La Nuit enchantée – by Raymond Jeannin
 1943 : Les Noirs jouent and gagnent – by Jean Image
 1943 : Puck baladin – by Érik (André Jolly)
 1943 : V'là l'beau temps – by André Rigal – série Les Aventures du Cap'tain Sabord
 1944 : À la découverte – by Arcady Brachlianoff
 1944 : Au clair by la lune – by Bogdan Zoubowitch
 1944 : Cap'taine Sabord dans l'île mystérieuse – by André Rigal – série Les Aventures du Cap'tain Sabord
 1944 : Leurs premières aventures by Jean-Louis Daniel
 1944 : Nimbus libéré by Raymond Jeannin
 1944 : Le Scaphandrier – by Arcady Brachlianoff
 1944 : La Vie des styles – by Érik (André Jolly)
 1944 : Le Voleur by paratonnerres by Paul Grimault
 1945 : Astres and désastres – by Arcady Brachlianoff – série Les Aventures by Kapok l'esquimau and by son ours Oscar
 1945 : Pierrot se libère – by Jean-Bernard Bosc
 1944 : Princesse Clé by Sol – by Jean Image
 1946 : Les Aventures d'Oscar la Bricole – by Paul by Roubaix
 1946 : Le Briquet magique – by Bogdan Zoubowitch
 1946 : Choupinet au ciel – by Omer Boucquey
 1946 : Cri-Cri, Ludo and l'orage – by Antoine Payen
 1946 : Les Enfants du ciel – by Wilma by Quiche
 1946 : La Flûte magique – by Paul Grimault
 1946 : Rhapsodie by Saturne – by Jean Image
 1947 : Anatole fait du camping – by Albert Dubout
 1947 : Anatole à la tour by Nesle – by Albert Dubout
 1947 : Le Petit Soldat – by Paul Grimault / Jacques Prévert
 1947 : Querelles by cœurs – by Marcel-Évelyn Floris
 1948 : Ballade atomique – by Jean Image and Albert Champeaux
 1948 : Jacky, Jackotte and les sortilèges – by Antoine Payen
 1949 : Le Base Ball – by Arcady Brachlianoff
 1949 : Fleur by fougère – by Ladislas Starewitch and Irène Starewitch
 1949 : Le Troubadour by la Joie – by Omer Boucquey
 1949 : Monsieur Tout-le-Monde – by Jean Image

Short films of the 1950s 

 1951 : Légende cruelle – by Arcady Brachlianoff and Gilles Pommerand
 1952 : Grrr – by André Rigal
 1952 : Léonard by Vinci – by Arcady Brachlianoff
 1953 : Pieter Brueghel l'Ancien – by Arcady Brachlianoff, Edmond Lévy and Gérard Pignol
 1954 : La Cigale and la Fourmi – by Jean Image
 1954 : Le Mystère by la licorne – by Arcady Brachlianoff and Jean-Claude Sée
 1955 : Images préhistoriques – by Arcady Brachlianoff and Thomas Rowe
 1955 : Le Loup and l'Agneau – by Jean Image
 1956 : Monsieur Victor ou la Machine à retrouver le temps – by Jean Image
 1957 : L'Aventure du Père Noël – by Jean Image
 1957 : Gag Express – by Albert Champeaux and Pierre Watrin
 1958 : Le Messager by l'hiver – by Bogdan Zoubowitch and Antoine Payen
 1958 : Paris-Flash – by Albert Champeaux and Pierre Watrin
 1958 : Le Petit Peintre and la Sirène – by Jean Image
 1958 : Voyage en Boscavie – by Jean Vautrin and Claude Choublier
 1959 : Les Astronautes – by Walerian Borowczyk / Chris Marker
 1959 : François s'évade – by Jean Image
 1959 : L'Horrible, bizarre and incroyable histoire by Monsieur Tête – by Jan Lenica and Henri Gruel
 1959 : Prélude pour orchestre, voix and caméra ou La Fille by la mer and by la nuit – by Arcady Brachlianoff

Short films of the 1960s 

 1960 : Le Chêne and le Roseau – by Jean Image and Denis Baupin
 1960 : Les Dents du singe – by René Laloux
 1960 : Moukengue – by Denise Charvein
 1960 : L'Ondomane – by Arcady Brachlianoff
 1960 : Villa mon rêve – by Albert Champeaux and Pierre Watrin
 1961 : Le Cadeau – by Jacques Vausseur and Dick Roberts
 1961 : Marcel, ta mère t'appelle – by Jacques Colombat
 1961 : Un oiseau en papier journal – by Julien Pappé
 1962 : Albert Marquet – by Arcady Brachlianoff
 1962 : La Chanson du jardinier fou – by Jacques Espagne
 1962 : Le Concert by M. and Mme Kabal – by Walerian Borowczyk
 1962 : La Fourmi géante – by Jean Image
 1962 : Mais où sont les nègres d'antan ? – by Michel Boschet and André Martin
 1962 : Maître – by Manuel Otéro and Jacques Leroux
 1962 : Les Nuages fous – by Henri Lacam
 1962 : Résurrection – by Germaine Prudhommeaux
 1962 : Sirène – by Jean Hurtado
 1963 : L'Encyclopédie by grand'maman – by Walerian Borowczyk
 1963 : L'Impossible géométrie – Jean-Pierre Rhein
 1963 : Merci, Monsieur Schmtz – by Albert Champeaux and Pierre Watrin
 1963 : Le Nez – by Alexandre Alexeieff and Claire Parker
 1963 : L'Œuf à la coque – by Marc Andrieux and Bernard Brévent
 1963 : Renaissance – by Walerian Borowczyk
 1963 : Vélodrame – by Robert Lapoujade
 1964 : A – by Jan Lenica (France/Allemagne)
 1964 : Acte sans parole – by Bruno Bettiol and Italo Bettiol
 1964 : Appétit d'oiseau – by Peter Foldès
 1964 : Contons fleurette – by Albert Champeaux and Pierre Watrin
 1964 : La Demoiselle and le Violoncelliste – by Jean-François Laguionie
 1964 : Les Jeux des anges – by Walerian Borowczyk
 1964 : Meurtre – by Piotr Kamler
 1964 : La Porte – by Jacques Vausseur
 1964 : Les Oiseaux sont des cons – by Chaval
 1964 : Les Temps morts – by René Laloux
 1965 : Les Automanes – by Arcady Brachlianoff
 1965 : Comme chien and chat – by Ladislas Starewitch
 1965 : Les Escargots – by René Laloux
 1965 : Le Jongleur by Notre-Dame – by Stefano Lonati and Italo Bettiol
 1965 : Martien 0001 – by José Piquer
 1965 : Pierrot – by Jacques Leroux
 1965 : La Planète verte – by Piotr Kamler
 1965 : Plus vite – by Peter Földes
 1965 : Souvenir d’Épinal – by Jean Image
 1965 : Un garçon plein d'avenir – by Peter Foldes
 1966 : L'Arche by Noé – by Jean-François Laguionie
 1966 : La Ballade d'Émile – by Manuel Otéro
 1966 : Contre-pied – by Manuel Otéro
 1966 : La Nativité racontée en image d'après les Écritures – by André-Édouard Marty
 1966 : Paris-Nice en voiture – by Albert Champeaux
 1966 : Space dance – by Albert Pierru
 1967 : Arès contre Atlas – by Manuel Otéro
 1967 : Éveil – by Peter Földes
 1967 : Images pour un clown – by Richard Guillon
 1967 : L'Ombre by la pomme – by Robert Lapoujade
 1968 : L'Araignéléphant – by Piotr Kamler
 1968 : Les Enfants by l'espace – by Jean Image
 1969 : Calaveras – by Jacques Colombat
 1969 : Le Dernier fantôme – by Jacques Ansan
 1969 : Labyrinthe – by Piotr Kamler
 1969 : Sourire – by Paul Dopff
 1969 : Une bombe par hasard – by Jean-François Laguionie
 1969 : Univers – by Manuel Otéro
 1969 : Visages by femmes – by Peter Foldès
 1969 : What happened to Eva Braun – by David McNeil

Short films of the 1970s 

 1970 : Les Chouettes – by Jean Rubak
 1970 : Délicieuse catastrophe – by Piotr Kamler
 1970 : Le Miroir – by Roger Amiot
 1970 : Patatomanie – by Jean Image
 1970 : Patchwork – by Manuel Otéro, Daniel Suter, Claude Luyet, Gérald Poussin and Georges Schwizgebel
 1971 : Le Cagouince migrateur – by Francis Masse
 1971 : Fantorro, le dernier justicier – by Jan Lenica
 1971 : Quand les gourous s'gourent – by C. Desaegher and B. Dessauvages
 1971 : 14 juillet – by Paul Tousch, Christian Ginsberg, Jean-Luc Blanchet, Francis Masse and Jean-Louis Forain
 1971 : Retour au bois joli – by Anna Harda – (France/Pologne)
 1971 : Le Robot – by Albert Champeaux and Pierre Watrin
 1971 : Sourire – by Paul Dopff
 1971 : Vive les bains by mer – by Jean Hurtado
 1972 : La Chute – by Paul Dopff
 1972 : Fin – by Roger Amiot
 1972 : Le Fumaillon – by Gilles Baur 
 1972 : Le Masque du diable – by Jean-François Laguionie
 1972 : Le Pays beau – by Martin Boschet
 1972 : Potr' and la fille des eaux – by Jean-François Laguionie
 1972 : Prolégomènes – by Alexis Poliakoff
 1972 : Raffiner toujours – by Jean Aurance
 1972 : Tableaux d'une exposition – by Alexandre Alexeieff and Claire Parker
 1972 : Un oiseau pas comme les autres – by Jean-Pierre Rhein
 1972 : Visuels – Catherine Lapras
 1973 : Le Chien mélomane – by Paul Grimault
 1973 : Cœur by secours – by Piotr Kamler
 1973 : Évasion express – by Francis Masse
 1973 : Folies Bergère – by Philippe Fausten
 1973 : La Montagne qui accouche – by Jacques Colombat
 1973 : L'Œuf by Colomb – by Christian Davi
 1973 : L'Oie bleue – by Gilles Baur
 1973 : L'Oiseau – by Ihab Shaker
 1973 : Le Pépin – by Reynald Bellot
 1973 : Souvenirs – by Nicole Dufour
 1973 : Tant qu'il y aura des feuilles – by Henri Heidsieck
 1973 : La Tête – by Émile Bourget
 1973 : Tour d'ivoire – by Bernard Palacios
 1973 : Un – by Paul Brizzi and Gaëtan Brizzi
 1973 : La Version originelle – by Paul Dopff
 1973 : Tour d'ivoire – by Bernard Palacios
 1974 : L'Acteur – by Jean-François Laguionie
 1974 : À la vôtre – by Monique Renault
 1974 : Comme il pleut sur la ville – by Didier Pourcel
 1974 : L'Empreinte – by Jacques Cardon
 1974 : Les Nouvelles aventures by la Tête – by Yan Brzozowski and Jean-Jacques Netter
 1974 : Le Pas – by Piotr Kamler
 1974 : Paysage – by Jan Lenica
 1974 : Square des abbesses – by Yves Brangolo
 1974 : Un comédien sans paradoxe – by Robert Lapoujade
 1974 : Un grain by sable dans le mécanisme – by Philippe Leclerc
 1974 : Un pied sous le chapeau – by Jean-Louis Miriel
 1975 : Ad vitam aeternam – by Gilles Baur
 1975 : Blanc bonnet and bonnet blanc – by Jean-Pierre Jacquet
 1975 : Claustrophobie – by Philippe Leclerc
 1975 : Dog Song ou les chiens voyageurs – by Julien Pappé and Michel Roudevitch
 1975 : Illusions – Nicole Dufour
 1975 : Oiseau by nuit – by Bernard Palacios
 1975 : La Perdue – by Dominique Fournier
 1975 : La Rosette arrosée – by Paul Dopff
 1976 : Autre-là – by Paul Cornet
 1976 : Le Déjeuner sous l'herbe – by Gilles Baur
 1976 : Dé profondis – by Henri Heidsieck
 1976 : Le Fantôme by l'infirmière – by Michel Longuet
 1976 : On voyage – by André Lindon
 1976 : La Petite Sardine rose – by Jean Image
 1976 : Une vieille soupière – by Michel Longuet
 1977 : L'Anatomiste – by Yves Brangolo
 1977 : Conclusion – by Jacques Barsac
 1977 : La Nichée – by M. G. Collin
 1977 : Les Nuits by Casimir and Lætitia – by Christine Deplante and Christian Deplante
 1977 : Le Phénomène – by Paul Dopff
 1977 : Tentation enfantine – by Christian Thomas
 1978 : Barbe-Bleue – by Olivier Gillon
 1978 : L'Évasion – by Jean-Pierre Jeunet and Marc Caro
 1978 : La Traversée – by Paul Dopff and Gabriel Cotto
 1978 : La Traversée by l'Atlantique à la rame – by Jean-François Laguionie
 1979 : Belzebuth roi des mouches – by Patrick Traon and Jean-Claude Langlart
 1979 : Blaise – by Hippolyte Girardot
 1979 : Cavalier mécanique – by Françoise Gloagen
 1979 : Drame dans la forêt – by Thérèse Mallinson
 1979 : D'une gompa l'autre – by Jacques-Rémy Girerd
 1979 : L'E motif – by Jean-Christophe Villard
 1979 : Flagrant délit – by Jean-Pierre Jacquet
 1979 : Harlem nocturne – by Pierre Barletta
 1979 : Jean-Émile – by Hippolyte Girardot
 1979 : Nuits blanches – by Nicole Dufour
 1979 : Supermouche – by Paul Dopff
 1979 : Le Temps d'aspirer – by Jean Gillet
 1979 : Le Trouble-fête – by Bernard Palacios
 1979 : Quatre mille images fœtales – by Jacques-Rémy Girerd

Short films of the 1980s 

 1980 : Actualités – by Jean-Jacques Sebbane
 1980 : L'Échelle – by Alain Ughetto
 1980 : Hunga – by Kali Carlini
 1980 : Le Manège – by Jean-Pierre Jeunet and Marc Caro
 1980 : Les Musus – by Otmar Gutmann
 1980 : Rien by spécial – by Jacques-Rémy Girerd
 1980 : La Tendresse du maudit – by Jean-Manuel Costa
 1980 : Tendre moignon – by Jean-Yves Amir and Olivier Langlois
 1980 : Les Trois Inventeurs – by Michel Ocelot
 1980 : Trois thèmes – by Alexandre Alexeieff and Claire Parker
 1980 : Un matin ordinaire – by Michel Gauthier
 1981 : L'Argent ne fait pas le moine – by Jean-Luc Trotignon
 1981 : Allons-y la jeunesse – by Gérard Collin
 1981 : Désert – by José Xavier
 1981 : Les Filles by l'égalité – by Michel Ocelot
 1981 : Morfocipris – by Jean-Christophe Villard
 1981 : Les Pieds Nickelés and le trésor d'Ali-Naja – by René Charles
 1981 : Trou – by Pascal Tirmant
 1982 : Chronique 1909 – by Paul Brizzi and Gaëtan Brizzi
 1982 : Je demain – by Jean-Pierre Ader
 1982 : La Légende du pauvre bossu – by Michel Ocelot
 1982 : Le Rêve by Pygmalion – by Josiane Perillat
 1982 : Sans préavis – by Michel Gauthier
 1982 : Le Voyage d'Orphée – by Jean-Manuel Costa
 1983 : Au-delà by minuit – by Pierre Barletta
 1983 : Compte courant – by Paul Dopff
 1983 : L'Invité – by Guy Jacques
 1983 : Néantderthal – by Jean-Christophe Villard
 1983 : Pedibus – by Paul Dopff
 1983 : La Photographie – by Gérald Frydman – (Belgium/France)
 1983 : La Princesse insensible – by Michel Ocelot
 1983 : Râ – by Thierry Barthes and Pierre Jamin
 1984 : La Boule – by Alain Ughetto
 1984 : La Campagne est si belle – by Michel Gauthier
 1984 : Carnet by voyage Quebec-La Rochelle – by Bruce Krebs
 1984 : 5 doigts pour el pueblo – by Bruce Krebs and Mireille Boucard
 1984 : Le Cirque des trois petits animaux tristes – by Jacques-Rémy Girerd
 1984 : Coloclip – by Jacques-Rémy Girerd
 1984 : L'Enfant by la haute mer – by Patrick Deniau
 1984 : Paysage by rêve – by Paul Dopff
 1984 : Question by forme – by Alain Monclin
 1985 : Bleu marine and rouge pompon – by Jacques Rouxel
 1985 : Carnets d'esquisses – by Michaël Gaumnitz
 1985 : Contes crépusculaires – by Yves Charnay
 1985 : Criminal Tango – by Solweig von Kleist
 1985 : 2 ou 3 choses que je sais by la Bretagne – by Bruce Krebs
 1985 : Les Deux petits noctambules – by Jacques-Rémy Girerd
 1985 : Le Petit Cirque dans les étoiles – by Jacques-Rémy Girerd
 1985 : La Prisonnière – by René Laloux and Philippe Caza
 1985 : La Quête du vieux clown – by Jacques-Rémy Girerd
 1985 : Spirale – by Henri Heidsieck
 1985 : Traverses – by Antoine Lopez
 1985 : Un beau matin – by Serge Avédikian
 1986 : L'Éléphant and la Baleine – by Jacques-Rémy Girerd
 1986 : Le Film file – by Nicolas Gautron
 1986 : Frankenstein circus – by Jacques-Rémy Girerd
 1986 : French Gallup – by Claude Huhardeaux
 1986 : La Montagne du loup – by Henri Heidsieck
 1986 : Les Perles by l'amour – by Francis Leroi
 1986 : Le Petit Cirque by toutes les couleurs – by Jacques-Rémy Girerd
 1986 : Les Quatre Vœux – by Michel Ocelot
 1986 : Taureau – by Marianne Guilhou
 1986 : Un point c'est tout – by Claude Rocher
 1986 : La Ville – by Sophie Mariller
 1986 : Zebra Crossing Blues – by Bruce Krebs
 1987 : Brume, escale trop courte – by Hugues Bourdoncle
 1987 : Comment Wang Fo fut sauvé – by René Laloux
 1987 : Cythère, l'apprentie sorcière – by Jacques-Rémy Girerd
 1987 : Élégance and joyeux anniversaire – by Paul Dopff
 1987 : L'Île fantôme – by Jean-François Laguionie
 1987 : Lucie s'est échappée – by Nicole Dufour
 1987 : Métamorphoses (série by sept jingles) – by Jacques-Rémy Girerd
 1987 : Pépère and Mémère – by Federico Vitali
 1987 : Transatlantique – by Bruce Krebs
 1987 : Variations – by Patrick Deniau
 1988 : Déchirure vaudou – by Bruce Krebs
 1988 : L'Escalier chimérique – by Daniel Guyonnet
 1988 : Jumpin' Jacques Splash – by Jerzy Kular and Isabelle Foucher
 1988 : La Princesse des diamants – by Michel Ocelot
 1988 : La Rage du désert – by Jacques-Rémy Girerd
 1988 : Sculpture, sculptures – by Jean-Loup Felicioli
 1988 : Stylo – by Paul Coudsi and Daniel Borenstein
 1988 : Thulé – by Serge Verny
 1988 : Le Topologue – by Marc Caro
 1988 : Toujours plus vite – by Jacques-Rémy Girerd
 1988 : Valence je t'aime – by Jacques-Rémy Girerd
 1988 : Une minute pour les droits by l'homme – by Jacques-Rémy Girerd
 1989 : À la recherche du temps perdu – by Gilles Burgard
 1989 : Amerlock – by Jacques-Rémy Girerd
 1989 : La Belle France – Bob Godfrey
 1989 : Book toon – by Jacques-Rémy Girerd
 1989 : Ça n'colle plus – by Vincent Bonnet
 1989 : Nos adieux au music-hall – by Laurent Pouvaret
 1989 : La Planète des salades – by Paul Dopff
 1989 : La Reine cruelle – by Michel Ocelot
 1989 : Princes and Princesses – by Michel Ocelot

Short films of the 1990s 

 1990 : Haut pays des neiges – by Bernard Palacios
 1990 : L'Intrus – by Michel Gauthier
 1990 : Le Manteau by la vieille dame (Ciné Si) – by Michel Ocelot
 1990 : Nature morte – by Georges Le Piouffle
 1991 : Les Effaceurs – by Gérald Frydman –  (Belgium/France)
 1991 : Elles – by Joanna Quinn
 1991 : L'Encadré – by  – (Belgium/France)
 1991 : Hammam – by Florence Miailhe
 1991 : I love you my Cerise – by Valérie Carmona
 1991 : L'Elasto Fragmentoplast, Les Quarxs pilote – by Maurice Benayoun, François Schuiten and Benoît Peeters – (France, Belgium)
 1992 : L'Amour est un poisson – by Éric Vaschetti
 1992 : La Ballerine and le ramoneur – by Jean Manuel Costa
 1992 : Le Dressage des nouvelles par Valentin le désossé – by Jean-Christophe Villard
 1992 : Le Horla – by Fréderic Wojtyczka
 1992 : Lugne Poe dans l'image – by Dirk Van Devondel
 1992 : Mondrian Variations – by Jaroslaw Kapuscinski
 1992 : Le Triangle des Bermudes – by Bruce Krebs and Eric Krebs
 1992 : Une mission éphémère – Piotr Kamler
 1992 : Le Wall – by Jean-Loup Felicioli
 1993 : Le Criminel – by Gianluigi Toccafondo
 1993 : Noi Siamo zingarelle – by Guionne Leroy
 1993 : Tableau d’amour – by Bériou
 1994 : Deux alpinistes – by Bruce Krebs and Pierre Grolleron
 1994 : Odeur by ville – by Georges Sifianos – (France/Greece)
 1994 : Histoire by papier – by Jean-Manuel Costa
 1994 : Histoire extraordinaire by Mme Veuve Kecskemet – by Béla Weisz
 1994 : Machinerie II – by Michel Digout
 1994 : Le Moine and le poisson – by Michaël Dudok De Wit
 1994 : Pedro – by Igor Leon
 1994 : Un nouveau départ – by Bruce Krebs
 1994 : Une bonne journée – by Matthias Bruhn
 1994 : Variations – by Daniel Borenstein
 1994 : Voleur d’écran – by Michel Aurousseau, Hervé Huneau and Guy Tual
 1995 : L'Abri – by Arnaud Pendrié
 1995 : La Grande migration – by Iouri Tcherenkov
 1995 : Paroles en l'air – by Sylvain Vincendeau
 1995 : Terra Incognita – by Olivier Cotte
 1995 : Schéhérazade – by Florence Miailhe
 1996 : ADN – by Patrice Chéreau and Marc Thonon
 1996 : Déjeuner sur l'herbe – by Bruce Krebs
 1996 : L'Égoïste – by Alain Gagnol and Jean-Loup Felicioli
 1996 : Ferrailles – by Laurent Pouvaret
 1996 : La Petite Sirène – by André Lindon
 1996 : Silenzio and Tralala – by Pierre Clément
 1996 : Silicose vallée – by Didier Guyard
 1996 : Taxi by nuit – by Marco Castilla
 1996 : Toro by nuit – by Philippe Archer
 1997 : Le Chat – by Benjamin Fleury
 1997 : Chéri, viens voir ! – by Claire Fouquet
 1997 : Du tableau noir à l'écran blanc – by Paul Dopff
 1997 : Dernière invention – by Lolo Zazar
 1997 : Du Sel pour les œufs ! – by Jean-Pascal Princiaux
 1997 : L'Envol des frères Wright – by Stéphane Roche and Fabrice Turrier
 1997 : Gudule – by Sylvie Guérard
 1997 : L'Homme aux bras ballants – by Laurent Gorgiard
 1997 : Hors-jeu – by Éric Belliardo
 1997 : Marcel attaque – by Diane Delavallée
 1997 : Paint Movie – by Rafaël Gray
 1997 : Pings 1 – by Pierre Coffin
 1997 : Pings 2 – by Pierre Coffin
 1997 : Le Roman by mon âme – by Solweig Von Kleist
 1997 : Un jour – by Marie Paccou
 1997 : La Vache qui voulait sauter par-dessus l'église – by Guillaume Casset
 1997 : Vilain Crapaud – by David Garcia
 1997 : 23, rue des Martyrs – by Luc Perez
 1997 : Ziboo – by Christophe Devaux and Christos Kokkinidis
 1997 : Zob by Moor – by François Perreau and Franck Guillou
 1998 : Amour… by gare – by Rémi Lucas
 1998 : Au bout du monde – by Konstantin Bronzit
 1998 : La Bouche cousue – by Jean-Luc Gréco and Catherine Buffat
 1998 : Captain Scott – by Arnaud Maironi
 1998 : Carnavallée – by Aline Ahond
 1998 : Le Cavalier bleu – by Bertrand Mandico
 1998 : Le Chat d'appartement – by Sarah Roper
 1998 : Cloison – by Bériou
 1998 : Le Cyclope by la mer – by Philippe Jullien
 1998 : Eden – by Diane Delavallée
 1998 : Mon Île, c'est le paradis – by Franck Guillem
 1998 : Mon placard – by Stéphane Blanquet and Stéphanie Michel
 1998 : La Neige qui tombe – by Stéphane Roche
 1998 : L'Œil du loup – by Hoël Caouissin
 1998 : La Vieille Dame and les Pigeons – by Sylvain Chomet
 1998 : Viva la Muerte – by Laurent Gorgiard
 1999 : Au premier dimanche d'août – by Florence Miaïlhe
 1999 : Harold's Planet – by Serge Elissalde
 1999 : Joyeux Anniversaire – by Darielle Tillon
 1999 : Maaz – by Christian Volckman
 1999 : Les Misérables – by Geoffroy by Crécy
 1999 : Les Noces by Viardot – by Jean Rubak
 1999 : Nous sommes immortels – by Daniel Guyonnet
 1999 : Paf le Moustique – by Jérôme Calvet and Jean-François Bourrel
 1999 : Ponpon – by Fabien Drouet
 1999 : Premier domicile connu – by Laurent Bénégui
 1999 : Le Puits – by Jérôme Boulbès
 1999 : Share Brothers – by Guillaume Le Gouill
 1999 : Squat – by Savin Yeatman-Eiffel
 1999 : Tant qu'il y aura des pommes – by Manuel Otéro
 1999 : The Gnome's Quest – by Pierre Coffin and Jean-Colas Prunier – (Japan/France)
 1999 : Un couteau dans les fourchettes – by Jean-Loup Felicioli and Alain Gagnol

Short films of the 2000s 

 2000 : Ainsi font... – by Sébastien Chort, Paul Guerillon, Florence Pernet
 2000 : Le Bain – by Florent Mounier
 2000 : La Danse des asperges sarrasines – by Christophe Le Borgne
 2000 : Disparitions – by Claire Fouquet
 2000 : Des Plofs à Noireilles – by Pauline Rebufat
 2000 : L'Enfant by la haute mer – by Laëtitia Gabrielli, Pierre Marteel, Mathieu Renoux and Max Tourret
 2000 : L'Escargot by Marion – by Manuel Hauss, Sophie Penziki, Mathieu Pavageau, Pierre Lutic, Charles Beirnaert
 2000 : Fini Zayo – by Catherine Buffat and Jean-Luc Gréco
 2000 : Geraldine – by Arthur by Pins
 2000 : Les Oiseaux en cage ne peuvent pas voler – by Luis Briceno
 2000 : On n'est pas des sauvages ! – by Aline Ahond, Marie-Christine Perrodin, Philippe Jullien and Guillaume Casset
 2000 : Raoul and Jocelyne – by Serge Elissalde
 2000 : Révolution – by Manuel Otéro
 2000 : Ronde – by Fabrice Piéton
 2000 : Tadeus – by Philippe Jullien and Jean-Pierre Lemouland
 2000 : Le Train en marche – by Robert Sahakiants (France/Arménie)
 2000 : Tutu – by Pascal Dalet and Georges Sifianos
 2000 : Zèbres – by Bruce Krebs
 2001 : Bas les masses – by Arnaud Pendrie
 2001 : La Belle au bois d'or – by Bernard Palacios
 2001 : Le Conte du monde flottant – by Alain Escalle – (France/Japan)
 2001 : La Fabrik – by Yann Jouette
 2001 : Les Filles, l'âne and les bœufs – by Francine Chassagnac
 2001 : Icebergclub – by Jean-Pascal Princiaux
 2001 : La Mort by Tau – by Jérôme Boulbès
 2001 : Le Nez à la fenêtre – by Alain Gagnol and Jean-Loup Felicioli
 2001 : Noé Noé – by Manuel Hauss
 2001 : Petite escapade – by Pierre-Luc Granjon
 2001 : Le Petit Vélo dans la tête – by Fabrice Fouquet
 2001 : Sommeils – by Ira Vicari
 2001 : Toro Loco – by Manuel Otéro
 2001 : Tso-ji – by Jean-young Kim
 2001 : Un âne – by Aline Ahond
 2001 : Zodiac – by Oerd Van Cuijlenborg
 2002 : La Cancion du microsillon – by Laurent Pouvaret
 2002 : Cœur en panne – by Bruce Krebs, Pierre Veck and Pierre Grolleron
 2002 : La Femme papillon – by Virginie Bourdin – (Belgium/France)
 2002 : François le Vaillant – by Carles Porta
 2002 : Le Jardin – by Marie Paccou
 2002 : Jean Paille – by Marc Ménager
 2002 : Ligne by vie – by Serge Avédikian
 2002 : Le Papillon – by Antoine Antin and Jenny Rakotomamonjy
 2002 : Insult to Injury – by Sébastien Cazes
 2002 : L'Odeur du chien mouillé – by Éric Montchaud
 2002 : Les Oiseaux blancs, les oiseaux noirs – by Florence Miailhe
 2002 : Le Trop petit prince – by Zoïa Trofimova
 2003 : Bip-Bip – by Romain Segaud
 2003 : Casa – by Sylvie Léonard
 2003 : Calypso Is Like So – by Bruno Collet
 2003 : Le Château des autres – by Pierre-Luc Granjon
 2003 : Circuit marine – by Isabelle Favez – (France/Canada)
 2003 : Destino – by Dominique Monféry – (France/UK)
 2003 : Circuit Marine – by Isabelle Favez
 2003 : L'Écrivain – by Frits Standaert – (France/Belgium)
 2003 : Electronic Performers – by Arnaud Ganzerli, Laurent Bourdoiseau and Jérôme Blanquet
 2003 : Merveilleusement gris – by Geoffroy Barbet Massin
 2003 : Patates – by Éric Reynier
 2003 : Le Portefeuille – by Vincent Bierrewaerts – (Belgium/France)
 2003 : Pour faire le portrait d’un loup – by Philippe Petit-Roulet
 2003 : Raging Blues – by Vincent Paronnaud and Lyonel Mathieu
 2003 : Rascagnes – by Jérôme Boulbès
 2003 : La Routine – by Cédric Babouche
 2003 : Salace – by Pierre Tasso
 2003 : Spirale – by Michael Le Meur
 2003 : Tueurs français – by Nicolas Jacquet
 2004 : 2002 nature – by Bruce Krebs
 2004 : L'Ami y'a bon – by Rachid Bouchareb
 2004 : L'Attaque des pieds by l'espace – by Yann Jouette
 2004 : La Dernière minute – by Nicolas Salis
 2004 : Des câlins dans la cuisine – by Sébastien Laudenbach
 2004 : L'Éléphant and les quatre aveugles – by Vladimir Petkevitch 
 2004 : L'Inventaire fantôme – by Franck Dion
 2004 : La Parole by vie – by Pierre La Police
 2004 : La Poupée cassée – by Louise-Marie Colon – (Belgium/France)
 2004 : Le Régulateur – by Philippe Grammaticopoulos
 2004 : La Révolution des crabes – by Arthur by Pins
 2004 : Sept tonnes deux – by Nicolas Deveaux
 2004 : Signes by vie – by Arnaud Demuynck – (France/Belgium)
 2004 : Une histoire vertébrale – by Jérémy Clapin
 2005 : À l'époque… – by Nadine Buss
 2005 : Le Building –  Marco Nguyen, Pierre Perifel, Xavier Ramonède, Olivier Staphylas, and Rémi Zaarour.
 2005 : Chahut – by Gilles Cuvelier – (France/Belgium)
 2005 : La Chute by l'ange – by Geoffroy Barbet Massin
 2005 : Le Couloir – by Jean-Loup Felicioli and Alain Gagnol
 2005 : Dies irae – by Jean-Gabriel Périot
 2005 : Le Fumeur by cigare – by Antoine Roegiers
 2005 : Le Génie by la boîte by raviolis – by Claude Barras
 2005 : L'Harmonie cosmique – by Jean-Marc Rohart
 2005 : Histoire tragique avec fin heureuse – by Regina Pessoa – (France/Canada/Portugal)
 2005 : Imago... – by Cédric Babouche
 2005 : James Monde – by Soandsau
 2005 : Ligne verte – by Laurent Mareschal
 2005 : Ma bohème – by Jean-Yves Parent, Mickaël Moercant and Joël Pinto
 2005 : Marottes – by Benoît Razy
 2005 : Nature morte – by Dominique Hoareau
 2005 : Novecento : Pianiste – by Sarah Van den Boom
 2005 : Les Proverbes flamands – by Antoine Roegiers
 2005 : Ruzz and Ben (Ruzz et Ben) - by Philippe Jullien
 2005 : Sucré – by Gaël Brisou 
 2005 : La Tête dans les étoiles – by Sylvain Vincendeau
 2005 : Un beau matin – by Serge Avédikian
 2006 : Dog Days – by Geoffroy by Crécy
 2006 : Éclosion – by Jérôme Boulbès
 2006 : L'Homme by la lune – by Serge Elissalde
 2006 : Laïka 1957 – by Khaï-dong Luong and Bruno Bonhoure
 2006 : Mauvais Temps – by Alain Gagnol and Jean-Loup Felicioli
 2006 : Même en rêve – by Alice Taylor
 2006 : Même les pigeons vont au paradis – by Samuel Tourneux
 2006 : Morceau – by Sébastien Laudenbach
 2006 : Raymond – by Fabrice Le Nezet, François Roisin, Jules Janaud – (France/Royaume-Uni)
 2006 : Street Life – by Kosal Sok
 2006 : The Return of Sergeant Pecker – by Pierre Delarue
 2006 : Une petite histoire by l'image animée – by Joris Clerté à voir sur le site by Mikros image en QuickTime ou en Flash
 2007 : Arrosez-les bien ! – by Christelle Soutif
 2007 : Aubade – by Pierre Bourrigault
 2007 : Bâmiyân – by Patrick Pleutin
 2007 : Berni's Doll – by Yann J.
 2007 : Boby le zombie – by Loïc Guetat
 2007 : Ça ne rime à rien – by Claude Duty
 2007 : Christmas Time is Here – by Sébastien Lasserre
 2007 : Contre la montre – by Michaël Le Meur
 2007 : L'Homme est le seul oiseau qui porte sa cage – by Claude Weiss
 2007 : Je suis une voix – by Cécile Rousset and Jeanne Paturle
 2007 : Le jour by gloire... – by Bruno Collet
 2007 : Le Manteau – by Orlanda Laforêt
 2007 : Nijuman no Borei – by Jean-Gabriel Périot
 2007 : Portraits ratés à Sainte-Hélène – by Cédric Villain
 2007 : Premier voyage – by Grégoire Sivan
 2007 : Prof Nieto Show: Lesson 3 (Cuniculus) – by Luis Nieto
 2007 : Soudain – by Vân Ta-minh
 2007 : Oktapodi – by Julien Bocabeille, François-Xavier Chanioux, Olivier Delabarre, Thierry Marchand, Quentin Marmier and Emud Mokhberi
 2007 : La Saint Festin – by Anne-Laure Daffis and Léo Marchand
 2007 : Le Vol du poisson – by Nicolas Jacquet
 2008 : Le Cœur d'Amos Klein – by Uri Kranot and Michelle Kranot
 2008 : En attendant – by Richard Negre
 2008 : Escale – by Éléa Gobbé-Mévellec
 2008 : Fêlures – by Alexis Ducord and Nicolas Pawlowski
 2008 : French Roast – by Fabrice O. Joubert
 2008 : Inukshuk – by Camillelvis Thery
 2008 : Jazzed – by Anton Setola – (Belgium, France, Pays-Bas)
 2008 : Mon chinois – by Cédric Villain
 2008 : Monsieur COK – by Franck Dion
 2008 : Morana – by Simon Bogojevic Narath – (France/Croatie)
 2008 : Nuvole, Mani – by Simone Massi
 2008 : L'Ondée – by David Coquard-Dassault
 2008 : Popolei – by Frédéric Mayer
 2008 : Rosa Rosa – by Félix Dufour-Laperrière
 2008 : Shaman – by Luc Perez – (Denmark/France)
 2008 : Skhizein – by Jérémy Clapin
 2008 : La Vita nuova – by Christophe Gautry and Arnaud Demuynck – (France/Belgium)
 2009 : Adieu général – by Luis Briceno
 2009 : Le Bûcheron des mots – by Izù Troin
 2009 : J'ai encore rêvé d'elle – by Geoffroy Barbet Massin
 2009 : Jean-François – by Tom Haugomat and Bruno Mangyoku
 2009 : Je criais contre la vie. Ou pour elle – by Vergine Keaton
 2009 : Les Escargots by Joseph – by Sophie Roze
 2009 : Fard – by David Alapont and Luis Briceno
 2009 : La Femme-squelette – by Sarah Van den Boom
 2009 : L'Homme à la Gordini – by Jean-Christophe Lie
 2009 : Logorama – du studio H5
 2009 : Masques - by Jérôme Boulbès
 2009 : Madagascar, carnet de Voyage – by Bastien Dubois
 2009 : Mei Ling – by Stéphanie Lansaque and François Leroy
 2009 : Mémoire fossile – by Anne-Laure Totaro and Arnaud Demuynck – (France/Belgium)
 2009 : Monstre sacré – by Jean-Claude Rozec
 2009 : L'Oiseau – by Samuel Yal
 2009 : Le Petit Dragon – by Bruno Collet – (France/Switzerland)
 2009 : La Promenade du dimanche – by José Miguel Ribeiro
 2009 : Regarder Oana – by Sébastien Laudenbach – (France/Belgium)
 2009 : Le Silence sous l'écorce – by Joanna Lurie
 2009 : Ru – by Florentine Grelier
 2009 : Thé noir – by Serge Elissalde
 2009 : Une nouvelle vie ! – by Fred Joyeux
 2009 : Les Ventres – by Philippe Grammaticopoulos
 2009 : Yulia – by Antoine Arditti

Short films of the 2010s 

 2010 : Après moi – by Paul-Émile Boucher, Thomas Bozovic, Madeleine Charruaud, Dorianne Fibleuil, Benjamin Flouw, Mickaël Riciotti and Antoine Robert
 2010 : Babioles – by Mathieu Auvray
 2010 : Chienne d'histoire – by Serge Avédikian
 2010 : Chroniques by la poisse – by Osman Cerfon
 2010 : Cliché ! – by Cédric Villain
 2010 : Le Cirque – by Nicolas Brault
 2010 : Les Ciseaux pointus – by Laurent Foudrot
 2010 : Cul by bouteille – by Jean-Claude Rozec
 2010 : Daniel, une vie en bouteille – by Emmanuel Briand, Louis Tardivier and Antoine Tardivier
 2010 : La Détente – by Pierre Ducos and Bertrand Bey
 2010 : Dripped – by Léo Verrier
 2010 : Ego sum petrus – by Julien Dexant
 2010 : La Femme à cordes – by Vladimir Mavounia-Kouka – (France/Belgium)
 2010 : La Femme du lac – by Mathilde Philippon-Aginski
 2010 : Françoise – by Elsa Duhamel
 2010 : L'Inventeur – by Gary Fouchy, Jérémy Guerrieri, Paul Jaulmes, Nicolas Leroy, Leslie Martin, Maud Sertour etAlexandre Toufaili
 2010 : Le Loup à poil – by Joke Van Der Steen and Valère Lommel
 2010 : Love patate – by Gilles Cuvelier
 2010 : Miss Daisy Cutter – by Laen Sanches
 2010 : Muzorama – by Elsa Bréhin, Raphaël Calamote, Mauro Carraro, Maxime Cazaux, Émilien Davaud, Laurent Monneron, Axel Tillement
 2010 : Pixels – by Patrick Jean
 2010 : Rubika
 2010 : Vasco – by Sébastien Laudenbach
 2010 : La Vénus by Rabo – by François Bertin
 2010 : The Waterwalk – by Johannes Ridder
 2011 : Aalterate – by Christobal by Oliveira – (France/Pays-Bas)
 2011 : Bao – by Sandra Desmazieres
 2011 : Bisclavret – by Émilie Mercier
 2011 : Chase – by Adriaan Lokman – (France/Pays-Bas)
 2011 : De riz ou d'Arménie  – by Hélène Marchal
 2011 : Dripped – by Léo Verrier
 2011 : Fire Waltz – by Marc Ménager
 2011 : La Douce – by Anne Larricq
 2011 : Le coût by la colonne – by Cédric Villain
 2011 : Les Conquérants – by Sarolta Szabo and Tibor Banoczki
 2011 : L'Histoire du petit Paolo – by Nicolas Liguori – (Belgium/France)
 2011 : Mourir auprès by toi – by Spike Jonze and Simon Cahn
 2011 : Une Seconde par jour – by Richard Negre
 2012 : Au poil – by Hélène Friren
 2012 : Ceux d'en haut – by Izù Troin
 2012 : 5:46 am – by Olivier Campagne and Vivien Balzi
 2012 : Cinq mètres quatre-vingt – by Nicolas Deveaux
 2012 : Comme des lapins – by Osman Cerfon
 2012 : Edmond était un âne – by Franck Dion – (France/Canada)
 2012 : Kali le petit vampire – by Regina Pessoa
 2012 : La Queste de Digduguesclin – by Sébastien Lasserre
 2012 : Le Banquet by la concubine – by Hefang Wei – (France/Canada/Switzerland)
 2012 : Le Printemps – by Jérôme Boulbès
 2012 : Les Souvenirs – by Renaud Martin
 2012 : Mademoiselle Kiki and les Montparnos – by Amélie Harrault
 2012 : Merci mon chien – by Julie Rembauville and Nicolas Bianco-Levrin
 2012 : N'Djekoh – by Grégory Sukiennik
 2012 : Palmipedarium – by Jérémy Clapin
 2012 : Peau by chien – by Nicolas Jacquet
 2012 : Pixel Joy – by Florentine Grelier
 2012 : Premier automne – by Aude Danset and Carlos by Carvalho
 2012 : Tram – by Michaela Pavlátová – (France/République tchèque)
 2012 : The Caketrope of Burton's Team – by Alexandre Dubosc
 2012 : The People Who Never Stop – by Florian Piento – (France/Japan)
 2013 : Betty's Blues – by Rémi Vandenitte – (France/Belgium)
 2013 : Braise – by Hugo Frassetto
 2013 : Cargo Cult – by Bastien Dubois
 2013 : El canto – by Inès Sedan
 2013 : Gli immacolati – by Ronny Trocker
 2013 : La Grosse Bête – by Pierre-Luc Granjon
 2013 : Hasta Santiago – by Mauro Carraro – (France/Switzerland)
 2013 : Lonely Bones – by Rosto – (France/Pays-Bas)
 2013 : Lettres by femmes – by Augusto Zanovello
 2013 : La Maison by poussière – by Jean-Claude Rozec
 2013 : Maman – by Ugo Bienvenu and Kevin Manach
 2013 : Marchant grenu – by François Vogel
 2013 : Méandres – by Élodie Bouédec, Florence Miailhe and Mathilde Philippon-Aginski
 2013 : Mr Hublot – by Laurent Witz and Alexandre Espigares – (France/Luxembourg)
 2013 : Mustapha and la clématite – by Sabine Allard and Marie-Jo Long
 2013 : Nain géant – by Fabienne Giezendanner – (France/Switzerland)
 2013 : Padre by Santiago Bou Grasso – (France/Argentine)
 2013 : Professor Kliq - Wire and Flashing Lights – by Victor Haeglin
 2013 : Sneh – by Ivana Ebestová – (France/Slovaquie)
 2013 : Sonata – by Nadia Micault
 2013 : Vigia – by Marcel Barelli – (France/Switzerland)
 2013 : Les Voiles du partage – by Pierre Mousquet and Jérôme Cauwe – (France/Belgium)
 2014 : La Chair by ma chère – by Antoine Blandin
 2014 : La Faillite – by Jean-Jean Arnoux
 2014 : Invasion – by Hugo Ramirez and Olivier Patté
 2014 : Man on the Chair – by Dahee Jeong – (France/Corée du sud]]
 2014 : La Petite Casserole d'Anatole – by Éric Montchaud
 2014 : Le Sens du toucher – by Jean-Charles Mbotti Malolo – (France/Switzerland)
 2014 : Tempête sur anorak – by Paul Cabon
 2014 : Wonder – by Mirai Mizue – (France/Japan)

See also
History of animation
Annecy International Animated Film Festival

References

Bibliography

Beck, J. Animation Art, Flame Tree Publishing Co Ltd, 2004. 
Halas, J. Masters of Animation, BBC Books, 1987.

External links

 Full-length French animated movies list

 
French